Bliss is a name, most usually a surname. Notable people with the name include:

Given name
 Bliss Carman (1861–1929), Canadian poet
 Franklyn Bliss Snyder (1884-1958), American educator and academic
 Kirby Bliss Blanton (born 1990), American actress

Surname

Academics
Anna Bliss (1843-1925), American teacher in South Africa
Charles K. Bliss (1897–1985), inventor of Blissymbols
Daniel Bliss (1823–1916), American founder of the American University of Beirut
Henry E. Bliss (1870–1955), American librarian and inventor of the Bliss classification
Michael Bliss (born 1941), Canadian historian and award-winning author
Philip Bliss (academic) (1787–1857), Registrar of the University of Oxford, etc.
William Henry Bliss (1835–1911), English scholar

Athletes
Alexa Bliss (born 1991), ring name of American professional wrestler Alexis Kaufman
Brian Bliss (born 1965), American soccer defender and coach
C. D. Bliss (1870–1948), American football player and coach
Dave Bliss (born 1943), American college basketball coach
Elmer Bliss (1875–1962), American baseball player
Frank Bliss (1852-1929), American baseball player
Homer Bliss (1904–1970), American football player
Jack Bliss (1882–1968), American baseball player
Johnny Bliss (1922–1974), Australian rugby league footballer
Karen Bliss (born 1963), American cyclist
Laurie Bliss (1872–1942), American football player and coach in the United States
Mike Bliss (born 1965), American NASCAR driver

Entertainers and artists
Arthur Bliss (1891–1975), British composer
Atlanta Bliss (born c. 1952), American jazz trumpeter
Boti Bliss (born 1975), American actress
Caroline Bliss (born 1961), British actress
Diana Bliss (1954–2012), Australian theatre producer
Douglas Bliss (1900–1984), Scottish painter
Harry Bliss (born 1964), American cartoonist
Ian Bliss (born 1966), Australian actor
Lillie P. Bliss (1864–1931), American art collector and patron, founder of Metropolitan Museum of Art
Lucille Bliss (1916-2012), American actress and voice artist
Philip Bliss (1838–1876), American hymn lyricist and composer
Ryan Bliss (born 1971), American digital artist
Sister Bliss (born 1970), British keyboardist, record producer, DJ, composer and songwriter
Thomas Bliss (born 1952), American motion picture producer and executive producer

Politicians and jurists
Aaron T. Bliss (1837–1906), U.S. Representative and Governor of Michigan
Charles Frederick Bliss (1817–1894), German American politician in Wisconsin
Cornelius Newton Bliss (1833–1911), American merchant and politician
John Murray Bliss (1771–1834), Associate Justice of the Supreme Court of New Brunswick, Canada
Justice Bliss (disambiguation)
Philemon Bliss (1813–1889), U.S. Congressman and jurist
Ray C. Bliss (1907–1981), American politician
Stephen Bliss (1787–1847), American minister and politician
Ward R. Bliss (1855-1905), Pennsylvania state representative
William L. Bliss (1876–1969), Associate Justice of the Iowa Supreme Court

Scientists, engineers, and doctors
A. J. Bliss (1862–1931), British iris breeder
Chester Ittner Bliss (1899–1979), biologist known for his contributions to statistics
Doctor Willard Bliss (1825–1889), American physician
Dorothy Bliss (1916–1987), American carcinologist
Eleanor Albert Bliss (1899–1987), American bacteriologist
Frederick J. Bliss (1857–1939), American archaeologist
Gilbert Ames Bliss (1876–1951), American mathematician
Nathaniel Bliss (1700–1764), English astronomer
Richard Bliss, American telecommunications technician arrested in Russia on charges of espionage in 1997
Timothy Vivian Pelham Bliss (born 1940), British neuroscientist

Other
Baron Bliss (1869–1926), British philanthropist in British Honduras
Duane Leroy Bliss (1835–1910), American industrialist
Ed Bliss (1912-2002), American journalist
Edward Bliss (1865-1960), American missionary to China
George Bliss (disambiguation), multiple people
Henry H. Bliss (1830–1899), American real estate dealer, first person killed in a motor vehicle accident in the U.S.
Stephen M. Bliss (born 1944), American general and educational administrator
Sylvester Bliss (1814–1863), Millerite minister and editor
Tasker H. Bliss (1853–1930), U.S. Army officer
William Dwight Porter Bliss (1856–1926), American religious leader and activist
William Wallace Smith Bliss (1815–1853), U.S. Army Officer
Zenas Bliss (1835–1900), U.S. Army General and Medal of Honor recipient

Fictional characters
 Carrie Bliss, from the television sitcom Good Morning, Miss Bliss
 Luther Bliss, from the Southern Victory series of alternate history novels

See also
 Bliss (disambiguation)